Tate Schmitt (born May 28, 1997) is an American soccer player who plays as a defender for Major League Soccer club Houston Dynamo.

Career

Youth, college, and amateur 
Schmitt played two seasons at Desert Vista High School prior to joining the Real Salt Lake Arizona academy.

Schmitt played four years of college soccer at the University of Louisville between 2015 and 2018, scoring 26 goals and tallying 17 assists in 80 appearances.  He was named to the 2015 ACC All-Freshman Team and the TopDrawerSoccer.com Freshman Best XI Second Team. As a junior he was named to the All-ACC Second Team and the United Soccer Coaches All-South Region Third Team.  His senior season saw him make the All-ACC First Team, TopDrawerSoccer.com Best XI Second Team, and United Soccer Coaches All-South Region First Team.  Schmitt helped the Cardinals win the 2018 ACC men's soccer tournament, with Schmitt being named tournament MVP.

Schmitt also played with USL Premier Development League side FC Tucson while at Louisville.

Professional

Real Salt Lake 
On January 3, 2019, Schmitt signed as a Homegrown Player for Real Salt Lake of Major League Soccer. Schmitt made his RSL and MLS debut on March 23, getting the start in a 2–1 loss against Los Angeles FC.  He ended his rookie season with 8 total appearances for RSL, 6 MLS appearances, plus an appearance each in the Open Cup and Leagues Cup.  Schmitt primarily played for RSL's USL Championship affiliate, Real Monarchs.  He scored 2 goals and had an assist in 15 regular season games for the Monarchs, while adding 1 goal and 3 assists in 4 playoff games, helping the Monarchs win the 2019 USL Championship Playoffs.

In a shortened 2020 season due to the COVID-19 pandemic, Schmitt made 4 appearances for RSL.

On June 10, 2021, Schmitt was loaned to his hometown club Phoenix Rising.  On June 12 he made his debut and scored his first goal for Phoenix in a 3–1 win over the Tacoma Defiance.  Schmitt ended the regular season with 22 appearances, 2 goals, and 1 assist, helping Phoenix finish 1st in the Western Conference.  Rising lost in the first round of the playoffs on penalties to Rio Grande Valley FC.

Following the 2021 season, Schmitt's contract option was declined by Salt Lake, but was re-signed on January 19, 2022. He scored his first goal for RSL on March 11, finding the right side netting in the 90+3rd minute to beat the New England Revolution 3–2.  Schmitt ended the regular season with 14 appearances and 2 goals, helping RSL finish 7th in the Western Conference, qualifying for the playoffs.  RSL lost in the first round on penalties to Austin FC, with Schmitt not appearing in the match.

Following the 2022 season, his contract option was declined by Salt Lake.

Houston Dynamo 
On February 17, 2023, Schmitt signed with the Houston Dynamo.  He made his Dynamo debut and scored his first goal for the club on February 26 in a 2–1 loss to FC CIncinnati in the opening match of the season.

Career statistics
As of February 26, 2023

Honors 
Real Monarchs

 USL Cup: 2019

Personal life 
Schmitt was born and raised in Phoenix, Arizona to RuthAn and Gil Schmitt.  His brother Reid played for FC Tucson and Phoenix FC while his brother Andrew played collegiately for the Fort Lewis Skyhawks.

References

External links 
 
 Real Salt Lake 

1997 births
Living people
American soccer players
Association football forwards
FC Tucson players
Homegrown Players (MLS)
Houston Dynamo FC players
Louisville Cardinals men's soccer players
Real Salt Lake players
Real Monarchs players
Phoenix Rising FC players
Soccer players from Phoenix, Arizona
USL Championship players
USL League Two players
Major League Soccer players
MLS Next Pro players